Ferrymead is a suburb south-east of Christchurch, New Zealand. It is the main thoroughfare for reaching the eastern sea suburbs such as Sumner, as well as home to a number of cliff-top residences and businesses along the estuary front. After the 2011 Canterbury earthquake, a number of prominent Christchurch businesses relocated to the Ferrymead area, making it into a secondary business hub.

Geography
Ferrymead is located on the Avon Heathcote Estuary, close to the point where the Heathcote River drains into the estuary, and three km west of the eventual outflow into Pegasus Bay. To the north lie the oxidation ponds from Christchurch's main sewage treatment works, which are within a large wildlife refuge and are inhabited by many species of bird life. To the south lie the Port Hills. The suburb is named for the ferry that operated across the Heathcote River during the early period of settlement. After the 2011 Christchurch earthquake, a number of businesses have relocated to the suburb, making it a small hub and helping other shops and cafes grow.

History

Early European settlement

European settlement of the area dates from the arrival of the early colonists in 1850. Farming was the major industry of the area from its early years and parts of the Heathcote Valley are still in agricultural production. Ferry services began about 1851 firstly as a cattle punt. James Townsend (1788–1866) operated the punt service from 1852. When he sold up, the new owners called his house Ferry Mead Hotel (the meadow of the ferry) and this gave the name to the suburb. These ferry services continued until the completion of the Heathcote Bridge in 1864. Shipping at this time was also able to travel up the Heathcote River as far as the Christchurch Quay adjacent to the present Radley Street Bridge. Later the Steam Wharf was opened by the present Tunnel Road intersection with Ferry Road. The Railway Wharf was opened in December 1863 along with the Ferrymead Railway.

Shipping on the river was very costly, around 2 pounds per tonne, more than it cost to bring cargo from the UK, and the ships were very small. Later on, steamships brought the cost down, but the difficulties of bringing ships over the bar of the Estuary and up the river itself were a considerable inconvenience. River shipping only outlasted the advent of the railway by a few years, although both the 1864 and 1907 bridges were designed to allow shipping to pass.

The original railway

On 1 December 1863 New Zealand's first public railway line was opened from Ferrymead to the central city.

The line was a temporary expedient to allow construction of the Heathcote/Lyttelton tunnel to proceed. It closed in 1867 after the opening of the Moorhouse railway tunnel to the port of Lyttelton.

Its track ran 7 km to the city of Christchurch, where the station was situated near to the site later occupied by the 1960 Christchurch station (closed in 1995). The locomotives and rolling stock were imported from Victoria, Australia, this being the main reason why the 5' 3" (1600 mm) railway gauge was adopted. Stations were located in later years at Woolston (formerly Hillsborough), Opawa and Linwood (the last two as passenger halts until the end of suburban trains in 1972). A branch also headed towards Heathcote at the time of tunnel construction.

The Moorhouse Tunnel was completed in a much shorter time than envisaged; and consequently the Ferrymead Railway was officially closed on 9 November 1867, the same day as the railway line to Lyttelton was opened. Following the subsequent conversion of the Main South Line to 3' 6" (1067 mm) gauge, all its broad gauge rolling stock was sold back to Australia. The ship they were placed on was wrecked off the New Zealand coast, but the cargo was salvaged. The rolling stock then lay abandoned for almost 100 years until the advent of Ferrymead Historic Park.

Following the commemoration of the centenary of this line, various groups including the New Zealand Railway and Locomotive Society (Canterbury Branch) (now the Canterbury Railway Society) became interested in developing the historical site. The Ferrymead Railway operates on the original railway formation as part of Ferrymead Heritage Park (formerly Ferrymead Historic Park).

Demographics

Brookhaven-Ferrymead had a population of 1,074 at the 2018 New Zealand census, an increase of 57 people (5.6%) since the 2013 census, and an increase of 3 people (0.3%) since the 2006 census. There were 390 households. There were 543 males and 531 females, giving a sex ratio of 1.02 males per female. The median age was 40.7 years (compared with 37.4 years nationally), with 198 people (18.4%) aged under 15 years, 201 (18.7%) aged 15 to 29, 477 (44.4%) aged 30 to 64, and 195 (18.2%) aged 65 or older.

Ethnicities were 84.9% European/Pākehā, 12.8% Māori, 5.9% Pacific peoples, 7.3% Asian, and 0.8% other ethnicities (totals add to more than 100% since people could identify with multiple ethnicities).

The proportion of people born overseas was 22.1%, compared with 27.1% nationally.

Although some people objected to giving their religion, 54.2% had no religion, 35.5% were Christian, 0.6% were Hindu, 0.3% were Muslim, 0.6% were Buddhist and 2.0% had other religions.

Of those at least 15 years old, 159 (18.2%) people had a bachelor or higher degree, and 165 (18.8%) people had no formal qualifications. The median income was $35,300, compared with $31,800 nationally. The employment status of those at least 15 was that 465 (53.1%) people were employed full-time, 147 (16.8%) were part-time, and 24 (2.7%) were unemployed.

See also
Ferrymead Heritage Park

References

Suburbs of Christchurch